Ship Ahoy is an album by Philadelphia soul group The O'Jays, released on November 10, 1973 on Philadelphia International Records. The album was a critical and commercial success, reaching #1 on Billboards "Black Albums" chart and #11 on the "Pop Albums" chart and launching two hit singles, "For the Love of Money" and "Put Your Hands Together." Conceived as a theme album built around the title track, Ship Ahoy includes socially relevant tracks and love songs under a cover that is itself notable for its serious subject matter. The album, which achieved RIAA platinum certification in 1992 for over 1 million copies sold, has been reissued multiple times, including in a 2003 edition with a bonus track. Ship Ahoy was the highest selling R&B album on the Billboard Year-End chart for 1974.

Songs and music
The songs on Ship Ahoy balance the romantic with the politically and socially conscious. In its review of the 2003 re-issue, Rolling Stone noted that the album's "main achievement was proving that it was indeed possible to be thoughtful and articulate without losing your funk."

The album's lead single was "Put Your Hands Together," a song urging cooperation and optimistic prayer for "a better day to come." Rickey Vincent, author of Funk: The Music, the People, and the Rhythm of the One, describes the song as "fairly standard musically", "with a strong gospel feel." The second single, "For the Love of Money," is a protest against materialism with a groove that Rolling Stone described as "downright orgiastic". The song was written around a bass line composed by Anthony Jackson, which in 2005 Bass Player Magazine described as "landmark." Bass Player went on to note that the song has "become one of the most recycled singles ever, sampled continually by rappers, and appearing on over 75 compilation CDs, numerous movie soundtracks, and, most recently, the theme for TV's The Apprentice."

The album's title song, "Ship Ahoy," was built around the theme of African captives being transported in a slave ship as part of the Middle Passage of the Atlantic slave trade. It had originally been penned by Gamble and Huff for inclusion in the soundtrack to Shaft in Africa, but the producers decided instead to give it to the O'Jays as part of a concept album centered around slavery. The song brought in the sounds of waves and cracking whips to add immediacy to lyrics which, according to PopMatters, personalized "the 'voyage' in ways that few black popular artifacts had previously done so—some three years before the publication of Alex Haley's Roots.  The book A Change is Gonna Come: Music, Race and the Soul of America notes that unlike the seminal work by Haley, "Ship Ahoy" is a hopeless, ominous song that offers "no sense that things are going to work out fine." In its 1974 review of the album, The New York Times characterized the song as "dark and occasionally spine-chilling." In 1993, The Miami Herald called it "a dark, atmospheric, frightening masterpiece that'll send a shiver up your spine."

In 1995, The Los Angeles Times dubbed "Ship Ahoy", along with the song "Don't Call Me Brother" as among "[t]he cream of the vocal trio's angry music." "Don't Call Me Brother" is a nearly nine-minute long album track that protests hypocritical claims of racial unity from backstabbers.

Artwork
The cover of the album depicted the band in a slave hold with illustrations of slaves. In its review, PopMatters commented that the use by producers Gamble and Huff of this imagery demonstrated not only their freedom as the heads of Philadelphia International Records, but also "how seriously the duo viewed popular music as a vehicle to 'teach and preach'." According to The Greatest Album Covers of All Time, the production of such politically conscious imagery from a band known for its popular music "was enough to make even the most myopic of white music fans take note that something was changing." Illustrator James Barkley was otherwise better known for illustrating children's books and a postage stamp—a 1972 image of Mount McKinley, Alaska—along with commercial design and other nature paintings.

Reception

Ship Ahoy reached #1 on Billboards "Black Albums" chart and #11 on the "Pop Albums" chart and contained two hit singles, "For the Love of Money" (#3 "Black Singles", #9 "Pop Singles") and "Put Your Hands Together" (#2 "Black Singles", #10 "Pop Singles"). The album certified "Gold" by the RIAA on January 21, 1974 and "Platinum" on August 11, 1992.

In addition to its commercial success, the album was critically well received. In a 1974 review, The New York Times described it as "[a] fine recent album" representing producers "Gamble and Huff at their creative best". AllMusic describes the album in its review as "[t]he "other" O'Jays album masterpiece", with "shattering message tracks and stunning love songs".

Releases
The album has been reissued multiple times by Philadelphia International as well as Epic Records, Legacy Records, Columbia Records, Sony Records and Sis Records. In 2003, it was re-released  by Sony and Epic with a bonus track, a live version of "Put Your Hands Together" recorded in London in 1974.

Track listing
All tracks written by Kenneth Gamble and Leon Huff, except where noted.

Side one
"Put Your Hands Together" – 4:07
"Ship Ahoy" – 9:41
"This Air I Breathe" (Gamble, Bunny Sigler) – 3:53
"You Got Your Hooks in Me" (Sigler) – 5:34

Side two
"For the Love of Money" (Gamble, Huff, Anthony Jackson) – 7:19
"Now That We Found Love" – 4:41
"Don't Call Me Brother" (Gamble, Sigler) – 8:58
"People Keep Tellin' Me" (John Whitehead, Gene McFadden, Victor Carstarphen) – 4:00

Personnel

Performers

Lenny Pakula – arranger
Leon Isley Brooks – keyboards
Anthony Jackson – bass
Eddie Levert – vocals
MFSB – orchestra, various instruments
William Powell – vocals
Walter Williams – vocals
Rocco Bene – trumpet solos

Production
James Barkley – illustration
Steven Berkowitz – A&R
Kenny Gamble – producer, surround mix
Norman Harris – arranger
Leon Huff – producer, surround mix
Don Hunstein – photography
Ed Lee – art direction
Bobby Martin – arranger
Lenny Pakula – arranger
Joseph M. Palmaccio – mastering
Darcy Proper – mastering
Al Quaglieri – remix producer
Leo Sacks – reissue producer
Joe Tarsia – engineer

Charts

Weekly charts

Year-end charts

See also
List of number-one R&B albums of 1974 (U.S.)

References

External links
Audio samples, hosted with permission at MTV.

1973 albums
The O'Jays albums
Albums produced by Kenneth Gamble
Albums produced by Leon Huff
Albums arranged by Bobby Martin
Albums recorded at Sigma Sound Studios
Philadelphia International Records albums